Tarennoidea is a genus of flowering plants belonging to the family Rubiaceae.

Its native range is Tropical and Subtropical Asia to Northern Australia.

Species:
 Tarennoidea axillaris (Ridl.) Tirveng. & Sastre 
 Tarennoidea wallichii (Hook.f.) Tirveng. & Sastre

References

Gardenieae
Rubiaceae genera